Every Mile Mattered is the fifth studio album by American contemporary Christian singer and songwriter and two time recipient of the GMA Dove Award for Female Vocalist of the Year, Nichole Nordeman. This is her first long-play in twelve years, however, it is the follow up to her 2015 EP, The Unmaking.

Critical reception 

Jessie Clarks of The Christian Beat writes, "Every Mile Mattered is a collection of songs taking a reflective look at her life's path to becoming the woman she is today. It's about the journey, the ups and downs of life, and not looking back with regret, but with gratitude."

Andy Argyrakis of CCM Magazine writes in his review that "Longtime listeners already knew Nichole Nordeman is perhaps the most thought-provoking, faith-based storytelling treasure since the late Rich Mullins, though just a year before his untimely death, a seemingly unsuspecting Prince even discovered her gifts first hand when he covered "What If" somewhat out of the blue."

Bea Willis of 5 Finger Review writes "Her writing is a strong as ever, the eleven track album spans across a soundtrack of inspirational songs with Nordeman's angelic vocals."

Josh Balogh of Jesusfreakhideout.com says in his review "Some artists come and go, fade from memory almost as quickly as they spring up. Then there are those musicians who stick with you long after their last notes sound. Nichole Nordeman is such a songwriter and musician. Everyone else in Christian music, take note. This is how it's done."

In his review Bob Marovich of journalofgospelmusic.com writes "Christian singer-songwriter Nichole Nordeman has a lot to say in her new album, Every Mile Mattered, and we need to hear it."

Track listing

Track information and credits taken from the album's liner notes.

References

Nichole Nordeman albums
2017 albums
Sparrow Records albums